Paul-Pierre Henry (Paul Henry) (21 August 1848 – 4 January 1905) and his brother Prosper-Mathieu Henry (Prosper Henry) (10 December 1849 – 25 July 1903) were French opticians and astronomers.

They made refracting telescopes and instruments for observatories, and were involved in the origin of the Carte du Ciel project.

Between the two of them, they discovered a total of 14 asteroids.  The Minor Planet Center credits their discoveries under "P. P. Henry" and "P. M. Henry", respectively. The lunar crater Henry Frères (Henry brothers) and the Martian crater Henry are named after them. They were jointly awarded the first Valz Prize in 1877 for their sky charts designed to facilitate the search for minor planets.

List of discovered minor planets

Obituaries

Paul Henry 
 AN 167 (1905) 223/224 
 MNRAS 65 (1905) 349
 Obs 28 (1905) 110
 PASP 17 (1905) 77 (one paragraph)

Prosper Henry 
 AN 163 (1903) 381/382 
 MNRAS 64 (1904) 296
 Obs 26 (1903) 396 (one paragraph)
 PASP 15 (1903) 230

References 
 

Optical engineers
19th-century French astronomers
Discoverers of asteroids
Sibling duos
Recipients of the Lalande Prize
French scientific instrument makers